Upper Manya Krobo District is one of the thirty-three districts in Eastern Region, Ghana. Originally it was formerly part of the then-larger Manya Krobo District in 1988, which was created from the former Kaoga District Council, until the northwest part of the district was split off to create Upper Manya Krobo District on 29 February 2008; thus the remaining part has been renamed as Lower Manya Krobo District. The district assembly is located in the eastern part of Eastern Region and has Asesewa as its capital town.

Sources
 
 Districts: Upper Manya Krobo District

References

Districts of the Eastern Region (Ghana)